This is a list of awards and nominations received by American actor, filmmaker, writer, and songwriter Tyler Perry.

Major associations

Academy Awards

Primetime Emmy Awards

Miscellaneous awards

African-American Film Critics Association

Alliance of Women Film Journalists

BET Best Movie Award

BET Comedy Awards

Black Movie Awards

Black Reel Awards

Boston Society of Film Critics

Central Ohio Film Critics Association

Georgia Film Critics Association

Gold Derby Awards

Golden Raspberry Awards

MTV Movie & TV Awards

NAACP Image Awards

Nickelodeon Kids' Choice Awards

Stinkers Bad Movie Awards

References

Notes

Sources

External links
 

Awards
Lists of awards received by American actor